Eagle Airpark  is a public use airport in Mohave County, Arizona, United States.

Facilities and aircraft 
It has one runway designated 17/35 with an asphalt surface measuring 4,800 by 50 feet (1,463 x 15 m).

For the 12-month period ending April 23, 2010, the airport had 16,000 general aviation aircraft operations, an average of 43 per day. At that time there were 47 aircraft based at this airport: 91.5% single-engine, 6.4% multi-engine and 2.1% jet.

References

External links 
 Eagle Airpark (A09) at Arizona DOT airport directory
 Aerial image as of 26 August 1992 from USGS The National Map
 

Airports in Mohave County, Arizona